James Richard Frith (born 23 April 1977) is British politician who served as the Member of Parliament (MP) for Bury North from 2017 to 2019. He is a member of the Labour Party.

Early life and career
Frith was born in London on 23 April 1977, the son of Richard Frith, who formerly served as Bishop of Hull and Bishop of Hereford. He was educated at Monkton Combe School and Taunton School, and studied Politics and Economics at Manchester Metropolitan University.

Frith was the lead singer in the rock band Finka, and later the Fusileers, performing nationwide at venues and festivals including Glastonbury.

During the 2005 General Election campaign, Frith worked as a Campaign and Communications Manager for the Labour Party and Ruth Kelly MP, then Secretary of State for Education.

Before his election to Parliament, Frith was the CEO and Founder of All Together, a social enterprise providing careers education and guidance services to young people to help them get into work.

Political career
In the 2010 Bury Metropolitan Borough Council Election, Frith unsuccessfully stood as the Labour Party candidate for Elton ward against incumbent Conservative Michael Hankey. He successfully stood for Elton ward again in 2011, gaining the open seat from the Conservatives after disgraced incumbent Denise Bigg chose not to seek re-election. Frith became the first Labour councillor to represent the ward since 2002.

Frith sat on the Licensing Committee during his four-year term as a Councillor, and opted to run for Parliament rather than seek re-election.

After being selected as the Labour Party candidate in Bury North for the 2015 General Election, he was profiled by the Young Fabians during the 2015 General Election campaign for a pamphlet on prospective parliamentary candidates named 'Fifteen for 2015'. In the pamphlet, Frith said "I think [Blair] did more for ordinary people and families than any government since", but added New Labour “should have gone further and faster”. He lost to incumbent Conservative David Nuttall by 378 votes despite a swing to Labour.

Frith contributed to the Fabian Society's book 'Never Again: Lessons from Labour's Key Seats' after his election defeat, criticising the leadership's 'failure to build on Labour's excellent record on enterprise and skills in government by engaging properly with the business community'.

He was re-selected to stand as the Labour candidate for Bury North in the 2017 General Election, fending off a challenge from high-profile candidate Karen Danczuk.

Parliamentary career 
Frith was elected as Member of Parliament for Bury North in 2017, defeating incumbent Conservative David Nuttall with a majority of 4,375. He made his maiden speech on 19 July 2017 during the debate on tuition fees.

Frith was a member of the Education Select Committee from 2017 to 2019, and chaired the All Party Parliamentary Group for Hospice and End of Life Care. In May 2018, he was appointed as Parliamentary Private Secretary to John Healey MP, the Shadow Secretary of State for Housing.

He edited a book entitled 'New Brooms', published by the Fabian Society in 2018, featuring a collection of essays on parliamentary reform written by several Labour MPs from the 2017 intake.

In July 2019, Frith worked alongside UK Music to secure and lead a debate in Westminster Hall on the decline of music in education, during which he urged the government combat the crisis facing music in education.

He lost his seat in the 2019 General Election to James Daly, Bury Council's Conservative Group Leader, by 105 votes and conceded after three recounts. Following his defeat, Frith described feeling a "a degree of release" from the weeks campaigning, but added he felt the impact of being "inches from winning".

Post-parliamentary activity 
In an opinion piece for LabourList during the 2020 Labour Leadership Election, Frith invited all the candidates to visit his marginal constituency to better understand the seats they need to win. Also in the piece, he was critical of the party's 2019 General Election campaign for 'sending hundreds of activists to Tory seats that we had no hope of winning' and cautioned against creating a 'manifesto that nobody believes'.

Personal life 
His father is Church of England Bishop Richard Frith, the former Bishop of Hereford and Bishop of Hull.

Frith and his wife Nikki have been Bury residents since 2009, where they have raised their four children. He has spoken about the challenges of balancing family life whilst being a Member of Parliament.

References

External links

Living people
Labour Party (UK) MPs for English constituencies
UK MPs 2017–2019
People educated at Monkton Combe School
People educated at Taunton School
Alumni of Manchester Metropolitan University
Labour Party (UK) councillors
Councillors in Greater Manchester
1977 births
Politicians from London
Members of the Parliament of the United Kingdom for Bury North
Labour Friends of Israel